Scopula undilinea is a moth of the  family Geometridae. It is found on the Loyalty Islands.

References

Moths described in 1900
undilinea
Moths of Oceania